Robert Joseph Auth (born July 4, 1956) is an American politician from New Jersey who represents the 39th Legislative District in the New Jersey General Assembly since taking office on January 14, 2014.

Education 
Auth earned his B.A. from New York University, where he studied History and Philosophy.

Career 
Replacing Bob Schroeder who did not run for re-election, Auth ran successfully in the 2013 general election. He was a delegate to the Republican National Committee in 2016. In the Assembly, he currently serves on the Financial Institutions and Insurance Committee, Commerce and Economic Development Committee, and the Judiciary Committee

Auth is the Chief Executive Officer at Plaza Travel and Insurance Services Ltd., a company he founded in 1985. He previously served as an aide to  Gerald Cardinale, advising on insurance and economic matters, and was a teacher for the North Bergen School District from 2004 to 2006. Auth also worked as an agency manager at the North Bergen Motor Vehicle Commission office.

Auth endorsed Donald Trump for President of the United States in 2016, the first legislator from New Jersey to do so. Auth was also invited to attend Trump's inauguration.

Committees 
Committee assignments for the current session are:
Commerce and Economic Development
Financial Institutions and Insurance
Judiciary

District 39
Each of the 40 districts in the New Jersey Legislature has one representative in the New Jersey Senate and two members in the New Jersey General Assembly. The representatives from the 39th District for the 2022—23 Legislative Session are:
Senator Holly Schepisi (R)
Assemblyman Robert Auth (R)
Assemblywoman DeAnne DeFuccio (R)

Personal life 
Auth has been a pilot since 1982. He and his wife Elsa have one grown son. Auth is a resident of Old Tappan, where he is the Republican Party municipal chairman.

References

External links
Robert J. Auth, NJ State Legislator page

1956 births
Living people
Republican Party members of the New Jersey General Assembly
New York University alumni
People from Old Tappan, New Jersey
Place of birth missing (living people)
21st-century American politicians